Rosemarie Dexter  (19 July 1944 – 8 September 2010), best known as Rosemary Dexter, was a British film actress who worked in Italy.

Life and career 
Born in Quetta from a British father and an Anglo-Burmese mother, Dexter entered the film industry in 1963, when during a vacation in Rome she met director Ugo Gregoretti who offered her a significant role for his science fiction film Omicron. She then became a very active actress until the mid-seventies, when she retired from acting at age 32.

She was found dead in her house in Recanati, in September 2010; she had been suffering a long illness.

Selected filmography 

 Omicron (1963) - Lucia
 I mostri (1963) - Luciana (segment "Come un Padre") (uncredited)
 Desideri d'estate (1964) 
 Romeo e Giulietta (1964) - Juliet
 Oltraggio al pudore (1964) - Giovenella
 Male Companion (1964) - L'étudiante / Student (uncredited)
 Casanova 70 (1965) - La cameriera
 Highest Pressure (1965) - Serenella
 For a Few Dollars More (1965) - Mortimer's Sister (uncredited)
 Almost a Man (1966) - Marina
 Per amore... per magia... (1967) - Esmeralda
 The Dirty Outlaws (1967) - Katy
 Gente d'onore (1967)
 The Sex of Angels (1968) - Nancy
 House of Cards (1968) - Daniela
 Partner (1968)
 The Shoes of the Fisherman (1968) - Chiara
 Vendetta for the Saint (1969) - Gina
 Marquis de Sade: Justine (1969) - Claudine
 I quattro del pater noster (1969)
 Blow Hot, Blow Cold (1969) - Laetitia
 Mio Mao: Fatiche ed avventure di alcuni giovani occidentali per introdurre il vizio in Cina (1970) - Jean
 Mazzabubù... Quante corna stanno quaggiù? (1971) - Emma, Lucio's wife
 Come Together (1971) - Ann
 Eye in the Labyrinth (1972) - Julie
 I figli chiedono perché (1972) - Mother of Michèle
 Lui per lei (1972)
 Seven Hours of Violence (1973) - Helena Karlatis
 Hi wa shizumi, hi wa noboru (1973)
 L'ultimo uomo di Sara (1974) - Anna
 Catene (1974) - Francesca
 La minorenne (1974) - Franca Sanna
 Till Marriage Do Us Part (1974) - Floidia di Maqueda
 Povero Cristo (1976) - Mara (final film role)

References

External links 

1944 births
2010 deaths
Italian film actresses
Italian people of English descent
Italian people of Anglo-Burmese descent
People from Quetta
Spaghetti Western actresses
20th-century Italian actresses